Woodmansterne railway station is a railway station which primarily serves the western areas of Coulsdon in the London Borough of Croydon, England. For ticketing purposes the station is in London Travelcard Zone 6. The station has a single island platform, which can be reached by a footbridge, and there is a ticket office on the platform.

All trains serving Woodmansterne are operated by Southern, which also manages the station.

Services
All services at Woodmansterne are operated by Southern using  EMUs.

The typical off-peak service in trains per hour is:
 2 tph to 

On Sundays, the service is reduced to hourly and runs between Tattenham Corner and  only. Passengers for London Bridge have to change at Purley.

It was initially proposed that from 2018, when the Thameslink Programme is completed, services on this line would be operated with longer, 12-car trains offering all-day direct services to/from  via . However, in September 2016, these proposals were dropped; instead, services on the Tattenham Corner line are to "remain as Southern South London Metro services with increased capacity as compared to today".

Connections
London Buses route 166 and non-TfL route 866 serve the station on Chipstead Valley Road to the south. A hail-and-ride section of London Buses route 463 runs along St Andrew's Road to the north of the station.

References

External links

Railway stations in the London Borough of Croydon
Former Southern Railway (UK) stations
Railway stations in Great Britain opened in 1932
Railway stations served by Govia Thameslink Railway